The Mystic Marriage of Saint Catherine (or Mystical) is  a painting by Correggio dating about the  mid-1520s currently held and exhibited at the Louvre in Paris, France.

History
The history of this picture can be traced right back to the beginning. Vasari mentions it as being in the house of a Modenese doctor, Francesco Grillenzoni; in 1582 Cardinal Luigi d'Este bought it, and presented it to Catarina Nobili Sforza, Countess of Santa Fiora and grand-niece of Pope Julius III. It was still in her possession in 1595. 

In 1614 the panel was in Rome, the property of Cardinal Sforza of Santa Fiora, who had no doubt inherited it. It was subsequently owned by Scipione Borghese, and then by Cardinal Antonio Barberini; the latter gave it to Mazarin in c. 1650. Louis XIV bought it from Mazarin's heirs in 1661, for 15000 livres. 

Correggio first depicted this subject in another painting originally held in Naples (and not universally accepted as his work). The Louvre picture dates from the early 1520s, and it shows clear signs of Leonardo's influence (esp. lips, hands, visage), to which Correggio was particularly susceptible in his endeavour to convey a soft and graceful effect.

A number of replicas of this painting have been made, many of which still survive. It has often been a source of inspiration to artists: in the 19th century it was copied by Louis Gustave Ricard, and several times by Fantin-Latour.

See also 
 Correggio
 Renaissance art
 Mystical Marriage of Saint Catherine
 Mystical marriage

References

External links

 Biographical note
 Appraisal of Correggio's Mystic Marriage
 The Mystic Marriage on the Web Gallery of Art
 Correggio, by Estelle M. Hurll, 1901, from Project Gutenberg
 Works by Correggio at www.antoniodacorreggio.org
 Correggio exposition in Rome, Villa Borghese, 2008

1520s paintings
Paintings by Correggio
Paintings in the Louvre by Italian artists
Nude art
Correggio